The 2012 Royal Trophy was the sixth edition of the Royal Trophy, a team golf event contested between teams representing Asia and Europe. It was held from 14–16 December at the Empire Hotel and Country Club in Jerudong, Brunei. After the two teams tied 8–8, Asia won a sudden-death playoff. Kim Kyung-tae and Yang Yong-eun faced Nicolas Colsaerts and Francesco Molinari in a four-ball match, with Kim's birdie giving Asia the win on the first hole.

Teams

Schedule
14 December (Friday) Foursomes x 4
15 December (Saturday) Four-ball x 4
16 December (Sunday) Singles x 8

Friday's matches (foursomes)

Source:

Saturday's matches (four-ball)

Source:

Sunday's matches (singles)

References

External links
Official site

Royal Trophy
Golf tournaments in Brunei
Royal Trophy
Royal Trophy